Sir Joseph William Trutch,  (18 January 1826 – 4 March 1904) was an English-born Canadian engineer, surveyor and politician who served as first Lieutenant Governor of British Columbia.

Early life and career

Born in Ashcott, England, Trutch's early childhood was spent partly in Jamaica, although his family returned to England in 1831, where he later attended grammar school in Devon. Following an apprenticeship to civil engineer Sir John Rennie, he travelled to California after hearing news of the California Gold Rush of 1849. He arrived in British Columbia in 1859, following the Fraser River gold rush of 1858.

He found employment by working various government contracts as a surveyor, and in 1862 was contracted to construct a portion of the Cariboo Road between Chapmans Bar and Boston Bar along the canyon of the Fraser River. Tolls collected from a suspension bridge along the road, along with prudent land acquisitions, made Trutch a wealthy man.

Colonial politics

Beginning in the 1860s, Trutch became involved in colonial politics, serving as the Chief Commissioner of Land and Works, and became a well-known resident of Victoria. As the Chief Commissioner of Land and Works, he was a member of the Legislative Council of British Columbia in the colony. Throughout his political career, Trutch was noted for his hostility to land claims by First Nations people, and demonstrated contempt for their concerns.

In a letter to his mother, Charlotte, regarding the Indians of the Oregon Territory he wrote, "I think they are the ugliest and laziest creatures I ever saw and we should as soon think of being afraid of our dogs as of them." (23 June 1850, Joseph Trutch Papers, UBCL, folder A1.b.) And in a letter to the Secretary of State, "I have not yet met with a single Indian whom I consider to have attained even the most glimmering perception of the Christian creed." (26 September 1871, BC Papers Connected with the Indian Land, p. 101) In 1867 Trutch refused to recognize the legitimacy of the reserves established by the former governor, James Douglas, and had them re-surveyed, reducing their size by 91%.

His memorandum of 1870 denied the existence of aboriginal title, setting the stage for the colonial assembly to prohibit aboriginal people from pre-empting unoccupied, unsurveyed, or unreserved land without special permission; this decision effectively established a  maximum and denied natives the right to acquire lands held by non-natives (A Sto:lo-Coast Salish Historical Atlas, page 164). These policies have had lasting repercussions in modern British Columbia politics with respect to the ongoing process of resolving native land claims.

Province of British Columbia

In 1863 Trutch's sister, Caroline Agnes Trutch, married Peter O'Reilly and in 1870, Trutch's brother John married the sister of the colonial governor Anthony Musgrave. Trutch and Musgrave became close. Following the establishment of the Canadian Confederation in 1867 they worked together to negotiate British Columbia's entry, which occurred in 1871 after they secured a promise for the construction of the Canadian Pacific Railway (CPR).

Trutch was the first Lieutenant Governor of British Columbia following Confederation, a position he retained from 1871 to 1876. Following his tenure as lieutenant governor, Trutch was appointed a "Dominion agent for British Columbia", and helped to oversee the construction of the CPR in the province.

He left this office in 1890 and returned to England. He died there in 1904 in Somerset, the county of his birth.

Legacy
The locality of Trutch, British Columbia along the Alaska Highway, is named after Joseph Trutch. The location is now a ghost town.

In 2007, a panel of historians hired by The Beaver included Trutch in their list the ten worst Canadians in history.

Streets in Vancouver, Victoria and Richmond used to be named after him. There are plans to rename a street in Chilliwack bearing his name.

A student residence building named for Trutch at the University of Victoria was renamed in 2017 because of his actions related to Indigenous peoples.

A residential street in the Kitsilano neighborhood of Vancouver was originally named Trutch Street until a decision in 2021 to rename the street with a Musqueam name due to Trutch's anti-indigenous policies. On September 30, 2022, the second annual Day of Truth and Reconciliation, Musqueam gifted the new name "Musqueamview Street" to the city of Vancouver.

In May 2022, a residential street in Richmond, British Columbia, was similarly renamed from Trutch Avenue to Point Avenue due to the racism and injustice associated with Trutch, the first lieutenant-governor of British Columbia, and to honour the 28th lieutenant-governor of British Columbia, Steven Point.

On July 11, 2022, Trutch Street in Victoria, British Columbia was renamed to Su'it Street.  The name, in the language of the Songhees and Esquimalt First Nations, Lekwungen, means Truth. This was after a unanimous vote in February 2022 by the Victoria City Council to rename the street, to further reconciliation efforts by the city.

References

External links
 

1826 births
1904 deaths
Canadian engineers
Canadian Knights Commander of the Order of St Michael and St George
Lieutenant Governors of British Columbia
People from Sedgemoor (district)
English emigrants to pre-Confederation British Columbia
Persons of National Historic Significance (Canada)
Members of the Legislative Council of British Columbia